Hütten is a municipality in the district of Rendsburg-Eckernförde, in Schleswig-Holstein, Germany. It is situated approximately 8 km southwest of Eckernförde.

Hütten is part of the Amt ("collective municipality") Hüttener Berge. The seat of the Amt is in Groß Wittensee.

References

Rendsburg-Eckernförde